89 Albert Embankment (informally known as Charity Towers) is a landmark building in Vauxhall on the River Thames in London. It is home to various British charities such as Comic Relief and Macmillan Cancer Support.

References

 

Architecture of London
Office buildings in London
Buildings and structures in the London Borough of Lambeth
Buildings and structures on the River Thames